John Charles George Kevin  (9 October 190913 February 1968) was an Australian public servant and diplomat.

Life and career

Charles Kevin, as he was known, graduated from the University of Sydney law school.

In June 1945, Kevin joined the Department of External Affairs.

In 1948, Kevin was acting High Commissioner of Australia to India. Kevin and his wife Hermine separated in 1949. In 1951 Kevin's wife Hermine petitioned for divorce and was granted an order for restitution of conjugal rights; when Charles Kevin petitioned for divorce in January 1952 the request was rejected.

Kevin was posted Minister to Indonesia in 1953, an appointment that then Minister for external affairs Richard Casey, Baron Casey said was part of a planned policy to build up diplomatic relations in Asia's south east. While he was Minister, Australia and Indonesia signed a new trade agreement for the trade of goods worth over £5 million.

After his Indonesia posting, from 1955 to 1959, Kevin was an assistant secretary in the external affairs department in Canberra. He arrived for his next posting as High Commissioner to Ceylon in 1959, serving in that capacity until 1961. In Ceylon, Kevin met Mary Therese Wilson, an Englishwoman and began a new relationship, whilst still married to Hermine.

Kevin was appointed High Commissioner to Pakistan, in 1961 he arrived in the country in September that year.

His divorce was finally granted in 1962, while he was Ambassador-designate to South Africa. On 6 May 1963, Kevin married Mary Therese Wilson.

His appointment as Ambassador to Sweden was announced in September 1967, with the intention for the posting to take effect on the retirement of Bertram Ballard. Before he could leave for Sweden, on 13 February 1968, Kevin died of cancer while still in office in Pretoria. Kevin's body was buried at the Zanderfontein Cemetery near Pretoria in South Africa.

Awards

In the 1964 Queen's Birthday Honours (Australia), Kevin was made a Commander of the Order of the British Empire during his time as Australian Ambassador in Cape Town.

References

1909 births
1968 deaths
Australian Commanders of the Order of the British Empire
People from the Central West (New South Wales)
Ambassadors of Australia to Indonesia
High Commissioners of Australia to India
High Commissioners of Australia to Pakistan
Ambassadors to South Africa
High Commissioners of Australia to Sri Lanka
University of Sydney alumni
20th-century diplomats
Deaths from cancer in South Africa